"Ska vi plocka körsbär i min trädgård" is a song written by Börje Carlsson and Little Gerhard (pseudonym for Karl Gerhard Lundkvist) and originally performed by Ann-Christine Bärnsten at Melodifestivalen 1975.

The song received attention due to its lyrics, which contained a high degree of sexual innuendo.

The song was tested for Svensktoppen, where it stayed for nine weeks during the period of 13 April – 8 June 1975, ending up 5th.

In 2004 The Honeypies recorded the song. Black Jack recorded the song on the 2010 album Festival. The same year the song was recorded by Drifters on the album Stanna hos mig.

Ann-Christine Bärnsten also performed the song during a Melodifestivalen 2010 pause act.

The single is also one of the titles in the book Tusen svenska klassiker'' (2009).

References

1975 singles
Melodifestivalen songs of 1975
Swedish-language songs
Ann-Christine Bärnsten songs
Drifters (Swedish band) songs
1975 songs
Philips Records singles
Songs about plants